Williams & Wilkins Co. v. United States, 487 F.2d 1345 (Ct. Cl. 1973), was an important intellectual property decision by the federal Court of Claims, later affirmed by a per curiam opinion from an evenly divided United States Supreme Court, with only eight justices voting (Harry Blackmun took no part in the decision of this case). The decision held that it was a fair use for libraries to photocopy articles for use by patrons engaged in scientific research.

This decision, written by Judge Oscar Davis, has been cited as part of the trend in which the courts will take a cautious approach to intellectual property issues raised by the advent of new technology. Rather than enforce the rights of the author articles by placing a prohibition on such copying, the Court in this case held that this was not prohibited by the law as written, leaving it to the United States Congress to address the issue through legislation.

In particular, according to David L. Lange (No Law), the case was a turning point for the doctrine of fair use: while for many decades the standards applied by courts to enforce copyright (or not) had been "arcana", the 1976 Copyright Act codified some fundamental criteria.

See also
List of United States Supreme Court cases, volume 420
CCH Canadian Ltd. v. Law Society of Upper Canada [2004]: Similar Canadian case
Sony Corp. v. Universal City Studios (1982)

Further reading

External links

United States Supreme Court cases
United States copyright case law
1973 in United States case law
Fair use case law
United States Supreme Court cases of the Burger Court
Tie votes of the United States Supreme Court